The FAI Cup 1961–62 was the 41st edition of Ireland's premier cup competition, The Football Association of Ireland Challenge Cup or FAI Cup. The tournament began on 18 February 1962 and concluded on 28 April with the final held at Dalymount Park, Dublin. An official attendance of 32,000 people watched Shamrock Rovers win their 14th FAI Cup title by defeating local rivals and League Champions Shelbourne 4-1.

First round

Second round

Semi-finals

Replay

Final

Notes
A.  Attendances were calculated using gate receipts which limited their accuracy as a large proportion of people, particularly children, attended football matches in Ireland throughout the 20th century for free by a number of means.

References
General

External links
FAI Website

1961-62
Ireland
Cup